Acacia orthotropica, commonly known as Mount Trafalgar wattle, is a shrub of the genus Acacia and the subgenus Plurinerves that is endemic to north western Australia.

Description
Like most species of Acacia it has phyllodes rather than true leaves. It blooms around January and produces simple inflorescences found in the axils and made up of spherical flower-heads containing 30 to 35 light golden coloured flowers.

Distribution
It is native to a small area in the Kimberley region of Western Australia. The limited distribution is confined to a single population within the confines of the Prince Regent National Park where it is a situated on a slope of broken sandstone slope next to a low basalt hill where it is part of an open shrubland community associated with a groind cover of species of Triodia.

See also
 List of Acacia species

References

orthotropica
Acacias of Western Australia
Taxa named by Russell Lindsay Barrett
Taxa named by Bruce Maslin
Taxa named by Matthew David Barrett